Nusrat Bhutto Colony is a neighborhood in the Karachi Central district of Karachi, Pakistan.

There are several ethnic groups in Nusrat Bhutto Colony including Muhajirs, Sindhis, Kashmiris, Seraikis, Pakhtuns, Balochis, Memons, Bohras,  Ismailis, etc. Over 99% of the population is Muslim. The population of North Nazimabad Town  is estimated to be nearly one million. The majority of population in Nusrat Bhutto Colony are Pakhtuns.

References

External links 
 Karachi Website

Neighbourhoods of Karachi
North Nazimabad Town